Adnan Al Abdallat (1943 – 9 March 2021) was a Jordanian neurologist. He participated in the discovery of Abdallat Davis Farrage syndrome in 1980.

Dr. Adnan Al Abdallat served in King Hussein Medical Center, a military hospital in Amman, Jordan. Abdallat held the position of head of the Neurologist Department in the hospital until he retired and opened his private research and clinic center.

Death 
Abdallat died on 9 March 2021, of an infection and complication with COVID-19.

References 

1943 births
2021 deaths
Jordanian neurologists
People from Al-Salt
Deaths from the COVID-19 pandemic in Jordan